Nicolás Lazo (born ) is an Argentine male volleyball player. With his club UPCN Volley Club he competed at the 2013 FIVB Volleyball Men's Club World Championship.

References

External links
 profile at FIVB.org

1995 births
Living people
Argentine men's volleyball players
Place of birth missing (living people)